Jelenia Góra (pron. ;; ; Exonym: Deer Mountain) is a historic city in southwestern Poland, within the historical region of Lower Silesia. Jelenia Góra constitutes a separate urban gmina as well as being the seat of surrounding Karkonosze County (formerly Jelenia Góra County). In 2021 the population of Jelenia Góra was 77,366. The area, including the oldest spa district of Cieplice Śląskie-Zdrój, is one of the most valued recreational and leisure spots in Poland.

The city's history dates back to as early as the 10th century, but the settlement was granted town rights under Polish rule in 1288. Jelenia Góra was founded on important trade routes linking the Holy Roman Empire and Bohemia with Eastern Europe. The region flourished as a result of trade privileges that became the basis for the establishment of weaving and mining industries during the late Middle Ages and early Renaissance periods. Jelenia Góra witnessed many historical conflicts such as the Thirty Years' War and the decisive Silesian Wars. During World War II, the city was miraculously saved from destruction.

The central suburb of Jelenia Góra possesses many historical and architectural structures of great significance, including the 17th-century town hall, baroque churches and a restored central marketplace as well as parks and gardens. The nearby Karkonosze National Park, visited by over 1.5 million tourists annually, has its headquarters in Jelenia Góra.

Toponymy
The name of the city as mentioned in historical sources, seems to be consistent: German-named Hirschberg but written differently through the centuries (e.g. Hyrzberc 1281, Hyrspergk 1305 and 1355 Hirssbergk, Hirsberg 1521). After the incorporation of local lands to Poland in 1945, the city was given the name of Jelenia Góra. In the sixteenth and seventeenth centuries, Latin words appear in different records, for example, Mons Cervi, Cervimontia, Monscervinus, Cervigera. The Polish name Jelenia Góra together with Hyrszberg is mentioned in the book "Krótki rys jeografii Szląska dla nauki początkowej" published in Głogówek in 1847 by writer Józef Lompa.

History
The city's origins officially date back to the legendary founding of the settlement by the Polish duke Bolesław III Wrymouth of the Piast dynasty in 1108, and in 2008 the city celebrated its 900th anniversary. Jelenia Gora is also mentioned as having been used as a staging point by Bolesław III for his military campaigns against the Czechs in 1110. The original fortified hilltop gród over time developed into a sizable trading settlement, which expanded outside of the old fortifications, forming a suburb around the original settlement. The Piast gród has been preserved as an archeological site – now the Bolesław Wrymouth Hill.

In 1281, the city was given an urban charter by the Polish duke Bolesław the Horned when German settlers migrated to the region. In 1281 the settlement was first mentioned as Hyrzberc, and in 1288 in Latin as Hyrsbergensium. In 1345 a city council was established. In 1348 an earthquake struck the city, and Duke Bolko II the Small granted it new privileges. When the Silesian Piasts lost inheritance and Agnes of Habsburg, the last duchess of Świdnica-Jawor died in 1392, the city passed to Bohemia, ruled by the House of Luxembourg. In 1426 and 1427 the city was invaded by the Hussites. From 1469 to 1490 it was part of Hungary and afterwards it was part of Bohemia, ruled by the Jagiellonian dynasty. In 1502 King Vladislaus II issued a privilege extending the city's autonomy and in 1519 King Louis II granted the right to an annual fair.

The town was inherited by Habsburg Austria in 1526, two years after the town adopted the Protestant faith. A Protestant school was built in 1566. In 1560 a fire destroyed large parts of the city and stopped the economic development, which until then had been characterized by linen-weaving. The city recovered when Joachim Girnth, a shoemaker on a return journey from Holland, introduced veil-weaving. The first "light veils" were offered in 1625, and five years later the city received an imperial privilege by Ferdinand II for these veils.

During the Thirty Years' War the city suffered badly. Hirschberg was beleaguered by troops of both parties, paid high contributions, and during a siege in 1634 the city burned down again. Two more sieges followed in 1640 and 1641. The town needed several years to recover. One reason for the new boost was the creation of a merchant society 1658, which secured Hirschberg's position as the most important center of linen and veil trade in the Silesian mountains during the 17th and 18th centuries.

The Protestants of the city were oppressed during the Counter-Reformation, but the second Treaty of Altranstädt, which allowed a Protestant community center and church to be established outside the medieval city walls, brought relief. Great sacrifices by the merchant society, especially its most prominent member Christian Menzel, made the construction of a large church, modelled after Church of Catherine in Stockholm, possible. The cemetery of the church was the preferred burial place for most merchant families.

Hirschberg was annexed with Lower Silesia by the Kingdom of Prussia during the Silesian Wars. The city was again partly destroyed, had to pay contributions and was seized several times. The detachment from Austria and the new border in the mountains to the south badly damaged the economy as the merchants lost a large part of their customers. Although Prussia took on substantial efforts to revive the economy, they never recovered completely and finally lost their position during the industrial revolution.

In 1800, John Quincy Adams, ambassador in Berlin at that time and future President of the United States, visited Hirschberg and said: "Nothing can be more beautiful than the location of Hirschberg, a beautifully built city with numerous splendid buildings, in a valley surrounded by hills on all sides, with the magnificent view of the Giant Mountains (Karkonosze/Riesengebirge Mountains)".

In 1871 the town became part of the German Empire with the Prussian-led unification of Germany, as one of the largest towns in the Province of Silesia. In 1889 the Deutsche Riesengebirgsverein (German Giant Mountains Club), an organization to protect the environment of the Giant Mountains (Karkonosze) and to promote tourism, was founded by Theodor Donat and 47 other dignitaries of the region.

After World War I, the town became part of the Prussian Province of Lower Silesia in 1919, and in 1922 became a separate city. During the Nazi era under the regime of Adolf Hitler, a subcamp of KZ Gross-Rosen was located in Hirschberg. On September 1, 1939, the day of the German invasion of Poland and the outbreak of World War II, Luftwaffe used the airport in Hirschberg to conduct air raids on Poland. In April 1940, the first transport of 2,000 Poles deported from Sosnowiec, Będzin and Olkusz for forced labor arrived to the city. In the city, the Germans organized 19 labor camps in which they imprisoned mainly Poles, Czechs, Frenchmen and Belgians, but also Luxembourgers, Russians, Ukrainians, Greeks, Estonians, including women. They also established four prisoner-of-war camps: two for French soldiers, one for Jews from different countries and one for Soviets. French prisoners of war organized a secret resistance movement and cooperated with Poles from other camps. In 1943 and 1944 there was a significant influx of Germans from the bombed German cities, and in 1944, after the crushing of the Warsaw Uprising, Poles deported from Warsaw were temporarily imprisoned there. When the Red Army captured the city, as a result of the influx of people in the last years of the war, there were 160,000 people in the city.

According to the decisions of the Potsdam Conference, the town was placed under Polish administration and became officially known by its Polish name of Jelenia Góra, which was first recorded in 1882, and is a literal translation of the German name "Hirschberg". All remaining German inhabitants were expelled westward and new Polish settlers came to the area. In the 1950s also Greeks, refugees of the Greek Civil War, settled in Jelenia Góra. The city was not destroyed in the war, but the state of its buildings and infrastructure declined over the next decade. The new Polish authorities dismantled the neglected tenements around the Old Town until 1965 and destroyed the cemetery of the former German Protestant church. Since then the buildings around the market place have been reconstructed in simpler 18th-century historical forms. The town was enlarged through the incorporation of surrounding localities, including the spa town of Cieplice Śląskie-Zdrój in 1976, now a district of Jelenia Góra.

Politics
Members of Parliament (Sejm) elected from Jelenia Gora-Legnica constituency in Polish parliamentary election 2011 included: Grzegorz Schetyna PO, Ewa Drozd PO, Norbert Wojnerowski PO, Zofia Czernow PO, Robert Kropiwnicki PO, Adam Lipiński PIS, Elżbieta Witek PIS, Marzena Machałek PIS, Wojciech Zubowski PIS, Ryszard Zbrzyzny SLD, Małgorzata Sekuła-Szmajdzińska SLD, Henryk Kmiecik RP.

Geography
City is located in the northern part of the Jelenia Góra Valley. From the west, the city is surrounded by mountains and foothills of Izera Mountains, north Kaczawskie Mountains, east Rudawy Janowickie Mountains and in the south Karkonosze Mountains.

Climate
Jelenia Góra has an oceanic climate  (Köppen climate classification: Cfb) using the  isotherm or a humid continental climate (Köppen climate classification: Dfb) using the  isotherm.

Population

The first written records from the mid-sixteenth century mention a population of approximately 3.5 thousand residents. In the late eighteenth and early nineteenth century, the population was about six thousand people, to rise up to about 20 thousand in the early twentieth century. The population of Hirschberg/Jelenia Gora in 1939 increased to over 35 thousand people and after World War II, the city had a population of 39 thousand residents, including more than 35 thousand Germans. During the period 1945–1947, the German population was mostly expelled from Jelenia Gora. After the creation of (voivodeship) Jelenia Góra province in 1975 and connection to the city surrounding towns, including Cieplice Śląskie-Zdrój, Population increased to 80 thousand. In subsequent years, the city's population grew, but mainly as a result of joining other nearby villages. The population rose to 93,570 inhabitants by 1996, but after the administrative reform in 1998 and the establishment of Lower Silesia voivodeship, the population of Jelenia Gora is steadily decreasing.  By December 2004 it was only 87,643, and by June 2010 it had fallen to 84,306 people.

Transmitter
In 1957, a broadcasting station for mediumwave radio was inaugurated in Jelenia Góra at ul. Sudecka 55.  Until 1967, it used a 47-metre-tall wooden tower, which may have been the only wooden radio tower built in Poland after 1945. In 1967 it was replaced by a 72-metre-tall steel mast.  Since the shutdown of the medium wave transmitter in 1994, this mast has been used for FM broadcasting.

Culture
Jelenia Góra has a wide range of cultural institutions, including theaters, a concert hall, and cinema and art exhibitions offices. Festivals such as the International Film Festival "Zoom Zbliżenia", International Street Theatre Festival, and the International Festival of Organ Music "Silesia Sonans" take place.

The "Silesia Sonans" European Organ Music Festival takes place annually in autumn.  Other cultural and entertainment events include concerts, art shows, exhibitions, fairs, and events geared for children and families.  The"Silesia Sonans" Festival is particularly noteworthy. Outstanding Polish and foreign artists gather to play pieces of famous composers inside the Garrison Church.

The Cyprian Norwid Theatre first opened as early as in 1904, with performance staged ceremoniously. The building was designed in the Art Nouveau style with features typical for 19th-century theatre edifices. Theatre remains active to this day with new performances staged regularly. The same building features a restaurant "OldPub" with live music.
 Open Air Museum of the Polish Army Armament – the largest open-air museum of this type in Lower Silesia. It is located on a former military unit. Since 2005 Łomnica has an open-air exhibition, which presents the radar equipment from entire Poland.
 Lower Silesian Philharmonic in Jelenia Góra (pl) is the concert hall of the Lower Silesian Philharmonic hosts many famous artists and the Jelenia Góra symphonists give concerts in Poland and abroad, participate in international festivals accompanying known persons from the art world and also support young talents. Concerts for the local audience, regional projects and educational activity are another vital part of the Philharmonic's undertakings.
 Zdrojowy Animation Theatre was built between 1833 and 1836 in the neoclassical style, it can accommodate up to 270 spectators. Founded by Schaffgotsch family, one of the three puppet theaters in Lower Silesia. Currently scene belongs to the Zdrojowy Animation Theater in the Zdrojowy Park which aside from its primary activity also organizes the cultural life of Cieplice.
 Natural History Museum is located in the Norweski Park in Cieplice. It was built in 1909 on the basis of a draft Frognersteren restaurant situated just below Oslo. Collections are mainly based on the now-defunct Schaffgotsch collection. It includes Poland's largest exhibition of birds.
 Jelenia Góra Cultural Center works with many events in the city (League of Rock, charity event WOŚP, September Jeleniogórski, Krokus Jazz Festival, Comedy Film Festival "Barejada", International conference on new educational techniques) also runs a number of workshops.
 Karkonosze Museum – The museum collects exhibits related to the history, ethnography, crafts and regional art. Particularly interesting exhibits include the largest artistic glass collection in Poland, ample 18th- and 19th-century glass painting collections, collections of tinwork and an ethnographic exposition – a Lusatian-built wooden cottage equipped with traditional equipment used in the 18th and 19th centuries.
 Karkonosze Light Festival – During the Light Festival the city gains a special kind of charm owing to colorful, professionally designed illuminations. The aim of the project is to present the most modern technologies and products used to illuminate cities, whilst maintaining care for the environment.
 ZOOM – ZBLIŻENIA International Film Festival is a festival promoting independent films. The format of the competition is open, anyone willing can challenge the silver screen with their piece.
 Antique and curio fair for a few days in September revives Jelenia Góra commercial roots. The local fair is one of the largest in Poland, it is attended by collectors from all of Europe. At the fair, you can buy old furniture and practical items, numismatic collections, books, trinkets and plenty of other things.
 International street theatre Festival – In August the Jelenia Góra Town Square for a brief period transforms into a stage for incoming artistic groups. Actors are not confined by the closed space of theatre building and the unique scenery and the scale of the plays provide unforgettable thrills.

Education 
The city is the educational hub for Jelenia Góra County and even further regions. Along with many primary and secondary schools, there are three higher education institutions in Jelenia góra:

 Karkonoska Państwowa Szkoła Wyższa,
 Wrocław University of Economics (faculty in Jelenia Góra),
 Wrocław University of Science and Technology (faculty in Jelenia Góra).

Landmarks

The Wojanowska gate and tower were part of the medieval defence complex that protected the road to Wojanów. Dungeons served as a prison. In 1480, the tower due to strong wind collapsed burying five people. Quickly it was rebuilt by adding the clock and the dome with a lantern, and this state has survived to this day. Coats of arms have been placed on the pillars: Prussian, Silesia, urban and inscription. In 1869, the gate was dismantled and moved to the barracks at Obrońców Pokoju street. After the renovation in 1998, returned to its former place. Located inside the medieval bastion was the St. Anne Chapel of the Wojanowska gate. In the portal above the entrance to the chapel there is an inscription: " „HonorI Magnae ChrIstI aVlae DIVae Annae ereCta”"(built for the glory of the great grandmother of Christ, St. Anna) with a hidden date of 1715.

The Basilica of St. Erasmus and St. Pancras built in the 14th century features the chapel dedicated to the Patrons of Jelenia Gora; however, it got its present form in the next century. The church was built of stone in the form of a three-nave basilica topped with a tower. Even today, you can admire numerous Gothic stone details best preserved in portals and window frames. The southern portal is exceptionally rich and interesting. Two sepulchral chapels (from the 17th and 18th century) were built into the church's walls; over 20 epitaphs and tombstones from the 16th and 18th century were placed on the two chapels. The main entrance to the chapel is located on the west, on the ground floor. The interior is also Gothic, but the fittings come from Renaissance and Baroque. The incredibly rich and monumental altar from the 18th century dominates the interior. The temple also houses priceless organs from the same period made in the workshop of an Italian organ builder – Adam Casparini. The 16th-century pulpit and the intarsiated (made of different wood types) choir stalls are a little older. There are also two 18th century figures on the church grounds – the Marian column is near the main entrance, and on the northern side, there is a sculpture of St. John of Nepomuk. It used to be located on one bridge over the Młynowka river; however, after it was damaged and then reconstructed in the 19th century, it was moved to its present place.

The Feast of the Holy Cross Church was erected as a proof of the grace of the Catholic Emperor of Austria for the Silesian evangelicals. Under the arrangement concluded in Altranstadt after a religious war they were granted the right to build six churches in Silesia which at that time was under Austrian rule. The design of the temple was prepared by the architect, Martin Frantz of Tallinn. The construction works lasted nine years (1709–1718) and the newly built church was deceptively similar to its prototype – St. Catherine's Church in Stockholm (the work of the same designer). The structure was erected on the plan of a cross and topped with a dome. The interior was equipped with a three-storey matronea which can accommodate more than two thousand members of the congregation. The railings were adorned with citations and paintings displaying scenes from the Old and New Testament. The altar together with the organ front placed over it make up an extended, beautifully adorned architectural form.

The town hall is the central point of the market square. The building was erected between 1744 and 1749. The entire square is surrounded by Baroque tenement houses with arcades, which originally used to serve the merchants to sell their goods. At the beginning of the 20th century, the tenement houses near the City Hall were bought and adjoined to the town hall (the so-called "Seven-Houses"). Right next to the town hall there is a fountain with a sculpture of Neptune – god of the seas. The sculpture is to commemorate old trade relations with overseas lands.

The Schaffgotsch family ruling vast lands around Karkonosze settled in Cieplice in 1675. Their previous seat was Chojnik Castle, burned down due to lightning strike. Their Schaffgotsch Palace's greatest ornament are the two semi-circular finished porticos with richly ornamented cartouches carrying the family crest of the owners. The interiors boasts early classicistic fittings. The palace currently houses a branch of the Wrocław University of Technology.

Jelenia Góra trams – Tram communication operated in Jelenia Góra in the years 1897–1969. Today there isn't much left of it – fragments of the tram line and a plaque can be found near town hall. One of the old tram carriages can be found by the north entrance to the town hall and serves as a souvenir kiosk (the other two trams are placed in front of the tram depot, in Wolności Street and at the bus terminal in Podgórzyn).

Jelenia Góra districts

Cieplice Śląskie-Zdrój

Known from the 13th century owing to warm, curative springs that gave it their name. Owing to the old owners of these lands, the Silesian Schaffgotsch family, at the turn of the 18th and 19th centuries its fame extended far beyond Silesia and managed to attract flocks of patients, including many eminent persons. Modern analysis shows that water therapeutic effectiveness is due to sulphur, silicon and fluorine compounds together with the high temperature reaching 90 Celsius degrees. Therapeutic sessions used to be based mainly on baths, today a wide range of treatments in the field of hydrotherapy, inhalation therapy as well as physiotherapy, phototherapy and electrotherapy.

Zdrojowy and Norwegian Parks
These two parks are located close to the main pedestrian street of Cieplice. Zdrojowy Park main avenue was created already in 1796, however, the entire park was created in the first half of the 19th century when the Schaffgotschs reconstructed part of the garden into an English garden and made a part of it available to the residents of Cieplice and patients.

At the beginning of the 20th century, owner of paper machine factory Eugen Fülner made several investments towards the spa. One investment was creating a picturesque park, called the Norwegian Park. Norwegian Park owes its name to a wooden building erected in 1909, whose finishing resembles Viking boats.

The Gallery and Zdrojowy Animation Theatre was built in 1797–1800 and designed by the architect Carl Gottlieb Geissler from Wroclaw. Inside there is still a functioning restaurant, a cigar lounge, a reading room and a large concert hall. Theatre was built between 1833 and 1836, it can accommodate up to 270 spectators. Founded by Schaffgotsch family built in the neoclassical style. Currently scene belongs to the Zdrojowy Animation Theater in the Zdrojowy Park.

Sobieszów
Sobieszów is located along the stream of Wrzosówka and nearby is the Chojnik castle. From the fourteenth century to 1945, the village belonged to the Schaffgotsch family and wore a German name Hermsdorf unterm Kynast. Karkonosze National Park management is established in Sobieszów. Location area creates favorable conditions for starting here hiking in the Karkonosze Mountains.

Chojnik Castle

Chojnik Castle (German Kynast, pol. Chojnasty 1945–1948) – a castle located near JeleniaGóra-Sobieszów on the top of the Chojnik mountain in Karkonosze Mountains. This mountain rises to a height of 627 meters above sea level, and from the southeast side is a 45-meter cliff plunging into the so-called Hell Valley. The fort is located in a nature reserve, which is the exclave of Karkonosze Mountains National Park.

"Chojnik Golden Bolt" Knight's crossbow tournament – Once a year the picturesque ruins of Chojnik play host to the struggles of knight fellowships. The tournament is accompanied by shows of medieval customs, dances, crafts and warfare.

Jagniątków 
Jagniątków (up to 1945 German Agnetendorf; Agnieszków 1945–1946) – a district of Jelenia Góra (since 1998) From here leads many trails in the mountains, both pedestrians and cyclists. It is the highest district of Jelenia Gora, and has good communication with the city bus (lines 15 and late-night course line 9).

Divine Mercy Church in Jagniątków 

The church was erected in the years 1980–1986. Its shape was inspired by the architecture of Podhale. Thanks to this shape the church perfectly inscribes itself into the mountainous landscape.

Jagniątkowski Black Cauldron
Jagniątkowsk Black Cauldron – glacial cauldron in the Western Sudetes in the Karkonosze Mountains and is located in south-western Poland, in the Western Sudetes in the western part of the band Karkonosze Mountains, in the Karkonosze National Park, north of the Black Pass, on the north-eastern slope of Śmielca and north-western slope of the Czech Stones.

Sports

Aviation
Owing to natural factors the Jelenia Góra Valley boasts exceptionally good conditions for gliding and hand-gliding. Consequently, the Jelenia Góra airport and the local flying club enjoys much popularity among flying aficionados from Poland and abroad alike.

Cycling
Jelenia Góra offers many and varied cycling routes like "Bóbr valley trail" (ER-6) or the biking ring road of Jelenia Góra, the Jelenia Góra- Łomnica biking trail. City organizes biking events:
 Jelenia Góra trophy – Maja Włoszczowska MTB Race – a biking race involving the top contenders of the amateurs of the world MTB scene.
Bike Parade – an entertainment event propagating biking, a healthy lifestyle and active outdoor leisure.
Dirt Town – bike stunts performed on the Town Hall square and a biking contest on a specially prepared obstacle course.
 In the years 1952–1956, 1979, 1986 and 1999–2007 by the city ran the route of Tour de Pologne, and in 2012 this event has returned to Jelenia Gora.

The FISU selected Jelenia Góra to host the 2014 World University Cycling Championship.

Sport clubs
 Vitaral Jelfa Jelenia Góra – women's handball team playing in Polish Ekstraklasa Women's Handball League: 3rd place in 2003/2004 season.
 KPR Jelenia Góra – Women's handball team playing in Polish Ekstraklasa Women's Handball League and in Polish First League
 Karkonosze Jelenia Gora – Polish football club based in Jelenia Góra. In the season 2013/2014 playing in the fourth division.

Kayaks
Kayakers may admire Jelenia Góra from their favourite perspective, using the water route on the Bóbr river. More informations at PTTK site.

Hiking Trail
Majestic mountains surrounding the city, offers many great trails for visitors, including a route to the highest peak of the Karkonosze – Śnieżka 1602 meters above the sea. During the mountain expeditions, visitors can stay overnight in mountain shelters like "Strzecha Akademicka", "Samotnia", "Odrodzenie" or "Dom Śląski".

Twin towns – sister cities

Jelenia Góra is twinned with:

 Bautzen, Germany
 Boxberg, Germany
 Cervia, Italy
 Changzhou, China
 Erftstadt, Germany

 Jablonec nad Nisou, Czech Republic
 Randers, Denmark
 Sievierodonetsk, Ukraine
 Tequila, Mexico
 Tyler, Texas, United States
 Valkeakoski, Finland

Former twin towns:
 Vladimir, Russia (terminated in 2022 due to the Russian invasion of Ukraine)

Notable people

 Sylwia Bogacka (born 1981), Olympic rifle shooter, silver medalist in London
 Ruth Bré (1862–1911), writer, women's rights advocate
 Babette von Bülow (1850–1927), writer
 Otto Finsch (1839–1917), ethnographer
 Hanna Foltyn-Kubicka (born 1950), politician
 Felix Funke (1865–1932), admiral
 Philipp Gotthard von Schaffgotsch, born and buried here.
 Georg Heym (1887–1912), early expressionist writer
 Wilhelm Iwan (1871–1958), author, historian, and theologian
 Karl Joel (1864–1934), philosopher
 Janusz Kudyba (born 1961), footballer
 Dawid Kupczyk (born 1977), bobsledder
 Omenaa Mensah (born 1979), TV presenter 
 Carl Püchler (1894–1949), Wehrmacht general
 Hanna Reitsch (1912–1979), test pilot
 Christian Jakob Salice-Contessa (1767–1825), merchant, politician and writer
 Ryszard Skowronek (born 1949), decathlete

References

Citations

Sources

External links

 jelenia.pl – news from the city 
 jeleniagora24 – news from the city 
 Jewish Community in Jelenia Góra on Virtual Shtetl
 Dolny Śląsk na fotografii – extensive collection of old and new views of the city 
 art1900.info Art Nouveau in Jelenia Góra 
 Jelenia Góra past and present presented on the old, and modern photographs, postcards, maps and plans.

 
City counties of Poland
Cities and towns in Lower Silesian Voivodeship
Cities in Silesia